Olga Elena Mattei Echavarría (born 1933 in Arecibo, Puerto Rico) is a Puerto Rican-born Colombian poet. She has won several poetry awards in Colombia and other Spanish-speaking countries. She has written around 23 books published, 41 unpublished and thousands of poems to be typed and compiled, all of them in Spanish.

Career 
In 1979 she participated in the "International Writers Program" at the University of Iowa (Usono). Her work has been included in more than 120 international and national anthologies and dictionaries. She has received 43 recognitions, including 9 international and national awards and 34 decorations, plaques and tributes. Her multimedia poem on the cosmos, "Cosmoagonía", has been presented at the planetariums of New York, Washington, Toronto, Santo Domingo, Puerto Rico, Mexico and Colombia. She has been invited to countless national and international conferences and has performed more than 400 recitals, including some 46 in the United States and Europe. She has been a lecturer in archeology, Egyptian civilization, Angkor Vat, the Khmer culture and the Mayan culture. It was included in the list of the 100 Antioquenos of the 20th century and in the collection of postcards "Grandes Hombres de Antioquia", (only 12 women), where she was the only writer, as well as in a list of biographical investigations of the University of Antioquia of the ten most important Antioqueno writers, in which she was the only living poet. She was an honorary cultural journalist for 25 years at El Colombiano and for almost 15 years has been the only critic of classical music, visual arts, poetry and civics (ad honorem) of Medellín, in El Mundo. She has conducted cultural radio and television programs. in which she was the only living poet. She was an honorary cultural journalist for 25 years at El Colombiano and for almost 15 years has been the only critic of classical music, visual arts, poetry and civics (ad honorem) of Medellín, in El Mundo. She has conducted cultural radio and television programs.

Awards 

National (Colombian) Poetry Award Guillermo Valencia in 1973
International Poetry Award Café Marfil, Madrid, in 1974
‘l’Ordre des Aniseteurs du RoI’, París, 1976
National Poetry Award "Porfirio Barba Jacob", Medellín, 2004
Premio Nacional de Poesía Meira del Mar, 2007

Up to 2009 she has received 18 national and international public recognitions, awards and decorations. Her cantata Cosmofonía was performed for the first time on radio and TV in France in 1976 with music of the conductor Marc Carles. 
Her poem Cosmoagonia, with scientific (astronomy) and humanistic content, has been performed in eight important planetariums around the world such as New York City and Washington. Olga Elena Mattei's literature activities go from reporting, arts and music criticism. As a graduate in philosophy and arts by Universidad Pontificia Bolivariana in Medellín she cooperates with the music critic column in the Medellin newspaper El mundo, in which she comments on, among others, the Orquesta Filarmonica de Medellin concerts. Besides, she is lecturer of arts and ancient cultures. Up to 2009 she has 16 publications and many others looking for publisher.

Works 
Sílabas de arena (1962) 118 pgs, Ed. Imprenta Departamental de Antioquia, "Ediciones La Tertulia", Medellín, 1962
Pentafonía (1964) 64 pgs, Ed. Universidad Pontificia Bolivariana, colecciòn "Rojo y Negro", Medellín, 1964
La gente (1974) 182 pgs, Ed. Colcultura, Colección "Biblioteca Colombiana de Cultura", Bogotá, 1974
Huellas en el agua (1974) International Poetry Award "Cafe Marfil" 1974
Cosmofonía (Cantata) (1977) with music of Marc Carles. Ed. Multipograficas Medellín 1977
Conclusiones finales (1989) 38 pags, Ed. Talleres Editoriales del Museo Rayo, Roldanillo (Valle del Cauca, Colombia), 1989
Cosmoagonía (Misa cósmica) (1993)
Regiones del más acá (1994) 465 pags, Ed. Secretaria de Cultura Departamental de Antioquia,"Colección de Autores Antioqueños", Medellín, 1994
Los ángeles del Oceano (2000) 41 pgs, Ed. Talleres Editoriales del Museo Rayo. Roldanillo (Valle del Cauca, Colombia)
Escuchando al Infinito (2005), 99 pgs, Sic, Bucaramanga. 
El profundo Placer de este Dolor (2007) 121 pgs Ed. Fondo ditorial Ateneo. Medellín, 2007
Cierra la Puerta de la Ciudad (2007) 59 pgs, Ed. Uryco. Medellín, 2007. National Poetry Prize Meira del Mar (2007)

References

External links 
Libro Sílabas de arena in PDF.
Libro Pentafonía in PDF.
Libro La Gente in PDF.
Libro Regiones del más acá in PDF.
Libro Cosmoagonia in PDF

1933 births
Living people
People from Arecibo, Puerto Rico
Puerto Rican people of Colombian descent
Puerto Rican people of Italian descent
Puerto Rican people of Spanish descent
Puerto Rican expatriates in Colombia
Naturalized citizens of Colombia
Colombian people of Italian descent
Colombian people of Puerto Rican descent
Colombian people of Spanish descent
Pontifical Bolivarian University alumni
20th-century Colombian poets
21st-century Colombian poets
20th-century Puerto Rican poets
21st-century Puerto Rican poets
Colombian women poets
International Writing Program alumni
20th-century Colombian women writers
21st-century Colombian women writers 
20th-century Puerto Rican women writers
21st-century Puerto Rican women writers